The 17th FINA World Championships were held in Budapest, Hungary from 14 to 30 July 2017.

Host selection
On 15 July 2011, at the biennial General Congress of FINA in Shanghai, the host-city of the 2017 World Aquatics Championships, Guadalajara, Mexico was announced as the winning bid. Kazan, Russia was awarded the 2015 Championships in the same vote, whereas the rival bid from Hong Kong, China was left unrewarded. Guangzhou (China) and Montreal (Canada) withdrew their bids shortly before the vote.

In February 2015, Mexico withdrew from hosting the world championships with organizers saying they could not afford the $100 million price tag that goes with hosting the multi-sport aquatic event. On 11 March 2015, it was announced that Budapest would host the 2017 Championships. The city was originally slated to host the 2021 edition.

Symbols
The logo of 2017 World Aquatics Championships was inspired by water and Hungarian folk art. The White water roses Lali (male) and Lili (female) in swimming costumes were selected as mascots of championships. Slogan of the championships is Water, Wonder, Welcome.

The Hungarian National Bank issued a commemorative version of the 50 Ft circulation coin on the occasion of the 17th FINA World Championships to be held in Hungary. and Hungarian Post produced 200,000 stamps and the commemorative booklet with envelope and stamp of first day mail cancellation.

Venues
The two main competition venues are located in Budapest: Danube Arena, a brand-new indoor swimming pool complex for swimming and diving on the eastern bank of the Danube just north of Margaret Island, and the existing Alfréd Hajós National Swimming Stadium, on Margaret Island itself, for water polo. Open water swimming events are held at Lake Balaton. High diving and synchronised swimming are held at temporary venues in Budapest.

Schedule
A total of 75 Medal events are held across six disciplines.

All dates are CEST (UTC+2)

Medal table

 Host nation

Participating nations

Media coverage
In the United States, NBCUniversal holds rights to the event. Events shall be televised on NBC, NBCSN, and the Olympic Channel. In the UK, the championships have been shown on the BBC Red Button and BBC Two.

References

External links

 
FINA World Aquatics Championships
World Aquatics Championships, 2017
2017 in Hungarian sport
International sports competitions in Budapest
International aquatics competitions hosted by Hungary
July 2017 sports events in Europe
2010s in Budapest